The 2014–15 Loyola Marymount Lions men's basketball team represented Loyola Marymount University during the 2014–15 NCAA Division I men's basketball season. The Lions were coached by new head coach Mike Dunlap. The Lions competed in the West Coast Conference and played their home games at Gersten Pavilion. They finished the season 8–23, 4–14 in WCC play to finish in a tie for ninth place. They lost in the first round of the WCC tournament to Santa Clara.

Before the season

Departures

Recruits

Roster

Schedule and results

|-
!colspan=12 style="background:#8E0028; color:#00345B;"| Regular season

|-
!colspan=12 style="background:#8E0028;"| WCC tournament

References

Loyola Marymount Lions men's basketball seasons
Loyola Marymount